The 1923 All England Championships was a badminton tournament held at the Royal Horticultural Hall, Westminster, England from 6 March to 11 March 1923.

Sir George Thomas won his fourth consecutive men's singles title. Lavinia Radeglia won the women's singles.

Final results

Men's singles

+ alias

Women's singles

Men's doubles

Women's doubles

Mixed doubles

References

All England Open Badminton Championships
All England
All England Open Badminton Championships in London
All England Badminton Championships
All England Badminton Championships
All England Badminton Championships